Kosmos 20 ( meaning Cosmos 20) or Zenit-2 No.13 was a Soviet optical film-return reconnaissance satellite which was launched in 1963. A Zenit-2 satellite, Kosmos 20 was the thirteenth of eighty-one such spacecraft to be launched.

Spacecraft
Kosmos 20 was a Zenit-2 satellite, a first generation, low resolution, reconnaissance satellite derived from the Vostok spacecraft used for crewed flights, the satellites were developed by OKB-1. In addition to reconnaissance, it was also used for research into radiation in support of the Vostok programme.

Launch
The Vostok-2 rocket, serial number G15001-01, was used to launch Kosmos 20. The launch took place at 09:36:00 GMT on 18 October 1963, using Site 1/5 at the Baikonur Cosmodrome. Following its successful arrival in orbit the spacecraft received its Kosmos designation, along with the International Designator 1963-040A and the Satellite Catalog Number 00673.

Mission
Kosmos 20 was operated in a low Earth orbit. Having spent eight days in orbit, the spacecraft was deorbited on 26 October 1963. Its return capsule descended under parachute and was recovered by the Soviet forces in the steppe in Kazakhstan.

See also

 1963 in spaceflight

References

Spacecraft launched in 1963
Kosmos satellites
Spacecraft which reentered in 1963
Zenit-2 satellites